Amirov may refer to:

Ajmal Amirov (born 1985), Tajikistani middle-distance runner
Artur Amirov (born 1992), Russian ice hockey player
Fikret Amirov (1922–1984), Soviet composer  
Ildar Amirov (born 1987), Kyrgyzstani association football player
Rufat Amirov, Azerbaijani military officer
Ruslan Amirov (born 1990), Kyrgyzstani association football goalkeeper
Said Amirov (born 1954), Russian economist, politician and convicted criminal
Ural Amirov (born 1980), Russian association football player